Cailleville is a commune in the Seine-Maritime department in the Normandy region in northern France.

Population

See also
Communes of the Seine-Maritime department

References

Communes of Seine-Maritime